Defending champion Bill Tilden defeated Wallace Johnson in the final, 6–1, 6–3, 6–1 to win the men's singles tennis title at the 1921 U.S. National Championships. It was Tilden's second U.S. Championships singles title and fourth major singles title overall. Tilden became the first male tennis player to win four consecutive major singles events.

The tournament began on September 9, weeks after the conclusion of the corresponding Women's singles event, and ended on 19th. For the first time, the men's tournament was held at the Germantown Cricket Club in Philadelphia instead of at Forest Hills.

Draw

Final eight

Earlier rounds

Section 1

Section 2

Section 3

Section 6

Section 8

References

Men's singles
1921